Bosnia and Herzegovina competed at the 2016 Summer Paralympics in Rio de Janeiro, Brazil, from 7 to 18 September 2016

Disability classifications 

Every participant at the Paralympics has their disability grouped into one of five disability categories; amputation, the condition may be congenital or sustained through injury or illness; cerebral palsy; wheelchair athletes, there is often overlap between this and other categories; visual impairment, including blindness; Les autres, any physical disability that does not fall strictly under one of the other categories, for example dwarfism or multiple sclerosis. Each Paralympic sport then has its own classifications, dependent upon the specific physical demands of competition. Events are given a code, made of numbers and letters, describing the type of event and classification of the athletes competing. Some sports, such as athletics, divide athletes by both the category and severity of their disabilities, other sports, for example swimming, group competitors from different categories together, the only separation being based on the severity of the disability.

Delegation 
The country sent a team of 14 athletes, both 13 men and 1 women, along with 4 officials to the 2016 Summer Paralympics. They competed in two sports, sitting volleyball and athletics.

Medalists

Athletics 

Men
Field events

Women
Field events

Sitting volleyball 

Bosnia and Herzegovina men's national sitting volleyball team qualified for the 2016 Games at the 2014 World Championships.

Men

Group B

Semi-finals

Gold medal game

See also
Bosnia and Herzegovina at the 2016 Summer Olympics
Bosnia and Herzegovina national sitting volleyball team

References 

Nations at the 2016 Summer Paralympics
2016
2016 in Bosnia and Herzegovina sport